Kalksburg is a former municipality in Lower Austria that is now a part of the 23rd Viennese district Liesing.

Today, the cadastral commune Atzgersdorf has got an area of 375,7 hectare.

Etymology 
The name Kalksburg stems from the surname of the noble house Chalbsperger – at times, the village also used to be called Kalbsberg, Kalksdorf and Kadoltsperg.

Geography 
Geologically speaking, the wooden and meadow area in the northwest of Kalksburg belong to the flysch zone while the one in the northeast belong to the Northern Limestone Alps. The area in between is counted among the geological era of Holocene.

History 

In 1188 the family of the „Chalbsberger“ was mentioned for the first time in a document.
In 1463 the castle of Kalksburg was destroyed by viennese citizens who were attacking it.
Between 1609 and 1773, the Jesuits owned the dominion. During the Battle of Vienna in 1683, the village was badly damaged.

Culture

People 
 Kaspar Benedict Hagleitner (d.1836), chaplain and founder of the Manharter
 Emil Hochreiter (1872–1938), composer (de)

References

Bibliography 
 Ferdinand Opll: Liesing: Geschichte des 23. Wiener Gemeindebezirks und seiner alten Orte. Jugend und Volk, Wien 1982,

External links 

 wien.at - Kalksburg
 
 Kalksburg in Allgemeines über die Orte des Bezirkes Liesing, 1911 (PDF)

 

Liesing
Katastralgemeinde of Vienna